Sven-Tore Jacobsen (born 18 August 1953) is a former Norwegian team handball player, and former head coach for the Norway women's national handball team.

Career
Jacobsen played 33 matches for the Norway men's national handball team between 1975 and 1978.

As coach from 1984 to 1993 he led the national team at the World Women's Handball Championship to a Bronze medal in 1986, and silver medals at the 1988 and the 1992 Summer Olympics.

He has worked for the Trondheim branch of the agricultural cooperative Felleskjøpet, and as CEO for the wholesaler Maske Gruppen.

Achievements
Olympic Games
1988: 2nd
1992: 2nd

World Championships
1986: 3rd
1990: 6th
1993: 3rd

References

1953 births
Living people
Norwegian male handball players
Norwegian handball coaches
National team coaches
Norwegian Olympic coaches